The National Statistics Institute of Chile (INE) is a state-run organization of the Government of Chile, created in the second half of the 19th century and tasked with performing a general census of population and housing, then collecting, producing and publishing official demographic statistics of people in Chile, in addition to other specific tasks entrusted to it by law.

Background
Its antecedents lie in the initiatives of president Manuel Bulnes and his minister, Manuel Rengifo, to draw up the second population census and obtain statistical data of the country. By Decree No. 18 March 27, 1843, the Office of Statistics was created, Ministry of the Interior to provide knowledge of the departments and provinces. It put the INE in charge of producing the national population census every 10 years, as required by the Census Act of July 12, 1843.

Law No. 187 of September 17, 1847 established the office as a permanent body of the state. By 1853, it was legally required that each section chief of the ministries collect and submit data to the Bureau of Statistics. Subsequently and by various legal modifications, it was called Dirección General de Estadísticas (1927–1953), Servicio Nacional de Estadísticas y Censos (1953–1960), Dirección de Estadísticas y Censos (1960–1970). It has called by its current name since 1970, and it has been under the Ministry of Economy since 1927.

Publications
The first official publication, National Repertoire (Repertorio Nacional), was released in 1850. It was followed by the Statistical Yearbook of the Republic of Chile (Anuario Estadístico de la República de Chile) published without interruption from 1837 to 1866.

In 1882 they published Statistical and Geographical Synopsis of Chile (Sinopsis Estadística y Geografía de Chile). In 1911, they began publishing independent volumes of statistics by subject.

External links
  

Chile
Government agencies of Chile
Demographics of Chile
Government agencies established in 1843
1843 establishments in Chile